Remote Device Management (RDM) is a protocol enhancement to USITT DMX512 that allows bi-directional communication between a lighting or system controller and attached RDM compliant devices over a standard DMX line. This protocol will allow configuration, status monitoring, and management of these devices in such a way that does not disturb the normal operation of standard DMX512 devices that do not recognize the RDM protocol.

The standard was originally developed by the Entertainment Services and Technology Association - Technical Standards (ESTA)  and is officially known as "ANSI E1.20,  Remote Device Management Over DMX512 Networks.

Technical Details

RDM Physical layer
The RDM protocol and the RDM physical layer were designed to be compatible with legacy equipment. All compliant legacy DMX512 receivers should be usable in mixed systems with an RDM controller (console)  and RDM responders (receivers).  DMX receivers and RDM responders can be used with a legacy DMX console to form a DMX512 only system. From a user’s point of view the system layout is very similar to a DMX system. The controller is placed at one end of  the main cable segment. The cable is run receiver to receiver in a daisy-chain fashion. RDM enabled splitters are used the same way DMX splitters would be. The far end (the non console or splitter end) of  a cable segment should be terminated.

RDM requires two significant topology changes compared to DMX. However, these changes are generally internal to equipment and therefore not seen by the user.

First, a controller’s (console’s) output is terminated. Second, this termination must provide a bias to keep the line in the ‘marking state’ when no driver is enabled.

The reason for the additional termination is that a network segment will be driven at many points along its length. Hence, either end of the segment, if unterminated, will cause reflections.

A DMX console’s output drivers are always enabled. The RDM protocol is designed so that except during discovery, there should never be data collisions. To ensure this lack of collisions, while making possible implementation on different platforms, there are times when all line drivers are required to be disabled. If nothing more than the termination was done, the line would float to some unknown level. In that case one or more random changes might be read on the line. These random changes greatly decrease system accuracy. So the biasing of the line is required

To assure this, section 2.4.1 (Line Bias Networks) of the standard says;
“The command port shall provide a means to bias the termination of the data link to a value of at
least 245 mV and verified by using the test circuit described in Appendix F.”

The standard further states that, the biasing mean “shall be polarized such that Data+ of the data link is positive with respect to Data- the data link. The Line Biasing network shall maintain this bias when the data link is loaded with the equivalent of 32 unit loads and common mode voltage is varied over the range of +7 volts to -7 volts DC.”

The standard does not require any particular circuit for providing the basis and termination; however, the simplest method is often a passive pull apart network.

Whatever method is used must be tested with the chosen driver chip to see that the design combination still meets the requirement of E1.20.  Tests are given in Appendix F of the standard. These tests are for design verification and are not required as production testing. Experience has shown many EIA485 drivers designed for 5 volt operation will pass the required tests.  It is not so clear that all 3.3 volt parts will pass.  In either case this performance must be verified. Details of the pull apart network and the tests can be found in  ANSI E1.20 - 2006.

Protocol 
RDM packets are interspersed with the existing DMX data packets being used to control the lighting. The DMX 512 specification requires that DMX packets begin with the start code. The default Start Code is 0x00(also known as the Null Start Code). By using the start code 0xCC, RDM packets can be safely inserted between DMX data packets without older non-RDM aware devices attempting to read them.

The DMX 512 specification required DMX connectors to be a 5-pin XLR type, with only the first 3 pins being used (pins 4 and 5 were reserved for "future use"). Unfortunately, various manufacturers started using the final two pins for various, proprietary purposes, such as low-voltage power or proprietary talk-back protocols. As a result, the decision was made to have all RDM communication on pins 2 and 3. This raises data collision concerns.

The RDM standard addresses this problem by ensuring that in all cases (except discovery) only one device is authorized to be transmitting at any given time. Only the controller (of which there can be only one) can start an RDM exchange. Responders can speak only if spoken to. The controller will always initiate all RDM communication.

All RDM devices have a unique identifier (UID) that consists of a manufacturer ID and serial number.

RDM communication can be broken down into three types:
 Discovery
 Unicast communication
 Broadcast communication

Discovery
Discovery is the only situation in which data collisions can occur assuming all connected devices behave correctly. The controller will broadcast a discovery command to all devices and await a response. If there are more than one device connected, the simultaneous responses will likely result in a data collision, and the controller will not receive a correctly formatted response. The controller will then refine its search to a smaller range of UIDs according to a binary search pattern. Once the controller receives a correct response it will attempt to mute the responding device. After a successful mute, the device is no longer allowed to respond to discovery messages, and the controller can continue searching for other devices. Once all devices have been muted (no responses are received to discovery commands), the discovery process is finished and the controller will hold a list of all connected devices.

The controller will need to periodically perform searches for new devices and assert that already discovered devices are still connected.

Unicast communication
General communication with a specific fixture occurs in a request-response pattern. The controller sends the request to the device, addressing it by the device's UID. When the request has been sent, the controller relinquishes control of the DMX line for a given period of time, so the device can transmit its response. Unicast communication is the only way in which data can be retrieved from a fixture (other than its UID which can be obtained using the discovery mechanism mentioned above). If the device does not respond within a given period of time, the controller can assume communication has failed, and may retry.

Broadcast communication
To quickly send instructions to multiple fixtures, RDM allows for broadcast communication. This allows the controller to send an instruction to all devices, or all devices from one manufacturer. As more than one device might be receiving the message, responses are not permitted in broadcast communication except during the Discovery process.

Uses for RDM
Since the RDM protocol travels on top of the DMX512 protocol, most of its uses will be in the fields of architectural and stage lighting.

This protocol will change the way that Lighting Technicians setup and maintain their lighting rigs, It can provide:
 Identification and classification of connected devices (Fixtures, Dimmers, Splitters, etc...)
 Addressing of devices controllable by DMX512 
 Status reporting of fixtures or other connected devices
 Configuration of fixtures and other DMX devices

Compatibility with existing DMX hardware
RDM was designed from the outset to work with existing DMX devices. The use of a different start code ensures all DMX-compliant devices that do not support RDM will simply ignore any RDM messages, however not all DMX devices have been made strictly to the DMX specification, and so devices that do not check the start code of incoming DMX packets will try to interpret RDM messages as DMX packets, which can result in flicker or other types of misbehavior.

Any devices that provide galvanic isolation or buffering on the DMX line (such as DMX splitters) have traditionally been designed to allow transmission in one direction: from the controller to the devices. As RDM requires bi-directional communication these devices will typically fail. Only devices that have been designed with RDM compatibility as a feature will typically work. Older DMX splitters that are not RDM compatible should still reliably send the DMX data, and block RDM communication.

Adoption
RDM was ratified in 2006. It took a while for it to be widely adopted.  There are now several mainstream lighting consoles supporting RDM as well as a growing list of RDM “responders” such as colour scrollers, dimmers, various LED Stage Lighting fixtures, and moving lights. Data distribution products including wireless DMX/RDM links are now available.

Support
DMX512 / RDM testers and configuration tools are available. With these tools a system containing RDM responders can be addressed, configured, and monitored without requiring a RDM console. The introduction of test tools has greatly increased the ability to design and evaluate RDM controllers and responders. Some companies make RDM-injector devices that go between the DMX controller and the responders. They inject RDM packets into the DMX data stream.

Cross-compatibility
As with any relatively new protocol, some inter manufacturer compatibility issues have and will crop up. To overcome these problems the DMX community has taken several actions.  The RDM Protocol Developer and User Forum exists to allow implementers to ask questions and work through potential problems. PLASA is holding RDM plugfests several times a year. These allow RDM manufacturers to interface gear from other manufacturers with their own. This has led to greater inter-operability. For RDM responders there is an open source suite of Automated Responder Tests.

Compatibility with new technologies
RDM has been designed with the traditional DMX-512 serial interface in mind. It relies heavily on a few assumptions that could affect its compatibility with other lighting technologies.

RDM relies on there being only one controller on a single line, to manage its collision prevention. A number of products exist to allow multiple DMX streams from multiple controllers being merged into one DMX stream. While this is fairly trivial in a unidirectional environment, it becomes much more complex when RDM is involved, as it can quickly get very difficult to route the RDM responses from devices back to the correct controller.

RDM relies on devices replying within a given time-frame of a response completing. If a device does not begin responding in the correct time-frame, the controller will most likely retry its request or give up. In a DMX-only environment this is not a problem as the delay between the device and the controller is likely to be very, very short. If the DMX is being routed down an intermediary medium (such as down a TCP/IP (Ethernet) network or wireless interface) then this can cause some problems. In general, if the manufacturer has control over the intermediary interface (as they do for protocols such as wireless DMX), it is possible to forward on the RDM responses as they are being received, along with a proxy system for the discovery process to provide the illusion of the RDM communication occurring as normal.

If the manufacturer does not have control over the implementation of the intermediary interface (such as when using an Ethernet network) then it is virtually impossible to send RDM messages back to a DMX-based RDM controller. It is possible, however, to maintain RDM communication with DMX-based devices and an Ethernet-based controller. Since lighting controllers are already rapidly heading towards being entirely Ethernet-based, this is the form DMX/RDM devices are most likely going to be seen in the future. With both RDM and DMX communication originating on the Ethernet medium, being converted through an Ethernet-to-DMX output device, and then proceeding to DMX-based devices.

See also
 Dimmer
 Lighting control console
 Lighting control system

External links
Specifications
 ANSI E1.20 RDM-Remote Device Management over USITT DMX512 Networks specification
Other
 RDM Protocol Developer and User Forums
 What is RDM?
  What does RDM mean for the rest of us? (ESTA Protocol Article)
 RDM Parameter Index
 Open Source RDM Testing Software
 RDM community

Stage lighting
Network protocols
American National Standards Institute standards